Islami Bank Medical College is a private Medical College located in Rajshahi, Bangladesh.

History
Islami Bank Medical College was established on 2003 in Rajshahi by Islamic bank Bangladesh. Islamic Bank is connected with the Jamaat-e-Islami Bangladesh political party. The college has a hospital attached to it. Raudha Athif, a Maldivian model, was a student in the college was found dead inside the dormitory of the college on 29 March 2017.

References

Medical colleges in Bangladesh
Hospitals in Bangladesh
Educational institutions established in 2003
2003 establishments in Bangladesh
Organisations based in Rajshahi